(Charles) Norman Haseldine (25 March 1922 – 16 October 1998) was a British Labour Co-operative politician.  Born in Sheffield, he served as Member of Parliament for Bradford West from 1966 until his defeat at the 1970 general election by the Conservative candidate John Wilkinson.

He married the former Georgette Elise Michelle Bernard in 1946: their four sons were Michael (born 1947), Gerald (born 1948), Paul (born 1955) and Luke (born 1965).

References

External links 
 

1922 births
1998 deaths
Labour Co-operative MPs for English constituencies
UK MPs 1966–1970
Members of Parliament for Bradford West